Pichincha is a province of Ecuador located in the northern Sierra region; its capital and largest city is Quito. It is bordered by Imbabura and Esmeraldas to the north, Cotopaxi and Santo Domingo de los Tsáchilas to the south, Napo and Sucumbíos to the east, and Esmeraldas and Santo Domingo de los Tsáchilas to the west.

Prior to 2008, the canton Santo Domingo de los Colorados was part of the Pichincha Province. It has since become its own province, Santo Domingo de los Tsáchilas.

The province is home to many rose plantations, which make up the bulk of Ecuador's floriculture industry.

Administrative divisions
The province is divided into eight cantons.

See also 
 
 Provinces of Ecuador
 Cantons of Ecuador
 Centro de Levantamientos Integrados de Recursos Naturales por Sensores Remotos
 Santa Lucia Cloud Forest

References 

 Gobierno de la Provincia Pichincha Web site of the Pichincha prefecture
 Data of Pichincha Geographical Data of the Province. Web site of the Pichincha Prefecture

External links
 Provincial Prefecture's official page 

 
Provinces of Ecuador
States and territories established in 1824